Guangning County, alternately romanized as KwongningCounty, is a county in western Guangdong, China, under the administration of the prefecture-level city of Zhaoqing.

Name
The Explanation of County Names states that the name of Guangning County—literally "widely" or "broadly pacified"—is a reference to the defeat of a large mob of bandits by the central government in 1559, shortly before the founding of the county.

History
Guangning County was founded on October 30, 1559, under the Jiajing Emperor of the Ming. It has formed part of Zhaoqing since at least the Qing.

Geography and climate
Lying in the valley of Sui River, Guangning has been developing along the riversides. Surrounded by green hills and mountains, Guangning is considered as a pearl in a greenery cradle.

Administrative divisions
The town of Nanjie is the centre of administration in this county. There are 16 other towns in Guangning. They are:

 Defunct: Shijian Town, Lianhe Town

Natural Resources

Mines
Tantalum, Niobium, Gold, Jade, Porcelain clay, granite etc.

Bamboo
Guangning is considered as the Hometown of Bamboo, since it has  of land built with various kinds of bamboos, and the annual production of it has reached 250 thousand tons.

Economy

Agriculture
Main plants includes rice, sweet potatoes, peanuts, Sugarcane, Teas, Mulberry

Industry
Woods processing, Chemistry, Sugar, Porcelain, Ink, Plastic, Paper-making, Bamboo-based arts.

In the year of 2002, the GDP of Guangning reached RMB 3.48 billion dollars.

Transportation
Roads are accessible to cities including Zhouqing, Shenzhen, Zhuhai. Guangzhou, the capital city of Guangdong Province, is currently 2.5 hours away by bus. But with the highway and railways under construction now, by 2010, the time can be shortened to one hour.

Tourism
To capitalize its natural resources, Guangning has developed eco-tourism attractions, including The Sea of Bamboo, The Emerald Lake, where you can immerse yourself in the greenery forest of bamboo, roll a boat on the greenery lake, have a sip of bamboo tea, while also taste the delicious local cuisine.

The local tourism has been developing prosperously in the last few years, bringing in tourists from home and abroad.

Special Products
Jade Teas, bamboo and bamboo-made products, such as bamboo charcoal cloth, bamboo charcoal pillow case etc., which proved to be environmental-friendly products.

Notes

References

Citations

Bibliography
 , reprinted 2000.

 
Zhaoqing
County-level divisions of Guangdong